Bregovo Municipality is a frontier municipality (obshtina) in Vidin Province, Northwestern Bulgaria, located along the right bank of Danube river in the Danubian Plain. It is named after its administrative centre - the town of Bregovo. The area borders on the Republic of Serbia to the west and Romania beyond the Danube to the north and it is the most northwestern part of the country.

Settlements 

Bregovo Municipality includes the following 10 places (towns are shown in bold):

Demography 
The following table shows the change of the population during the last four decades.

Ethnic composition
According to the 2011 census, among those who answered the optional question on ethnic identification, the ethnic composition of the municipality was the following:

Religion
According to the latest Bulgarian census of 2011, the religious composition, among those who answered the optional question on religious identification, was the following:

An overwhelming majority of the population of Bregovo Municipality identify themselves as Christians. At the 2011 census, 83.9% of respondents identified as Orthodox Christians belonging to the Bulgarian Orthodox Church.

See also
Provinces of Bulgaria
Municipalities of Bulgaria
List of cities and towns in Bulgaria

References

External links
 Info website 

Municipalities of Vidin Province